The 2019 Baku FIA Formula 2 round was a pair of motor races for Formula 2 cars that took place on 27 and 28 April 2019 at the Baku Street Circuit in Baku, Azerbaijan as part of the FIA Formula 2 Championship. It was the second round of the 2019 FIA Formula 2 Championship and was run in support of the 2019 Azerbaijan Grand Prix.

Classification

Qualifying

Notes
 – Mahaveer Raghunathan was given a ten-place grid penalty for taking the chequered flag twice at the previous round in Bahrain. He was also ordered to start from the pit lane for failing to stop for the official weight check.
 – Sean Gelael failed to set a lap time during qualifying but was given permission to race by the stewards.

Feature race

Notes
 – Luca Ghiotto finished the race in 6th but was given a 5 seconds time penalty after the race for causing a collision with Sérgio Sette Câmara during the restart of a late Safety Car period.
 – Nobuharu Matsushita set the fastest lap, but finished outside the top 10, so he was ineligible to score points for the fastest lap. The two bonus points for the fastest lap were awarded to Jack Aitken as he set the fastest lap of those who finished inside the top 10 with a time of 1:56.961.

Sprint race

Notes
 – Luca Ghiotto set the fastest lap, but did not finish the race, so he was ineligible to score points for the fastest lap. The two bonus points for the fastest lap were awarded to Sérgio Sette Câmara as he set the fastest lap of those finishing in the top 10 with a time of 1:57.941.
 – Dorian Boccolacci was due to start the sprint race in 4th but was given a two-place grid penalty for failing to follow the race director's instructions.

Championship standings after the round

Drivers' Championship standings

Teams' Championship standings

References

External links
 

Baku
Baku
Formula 2